The 1955 Mississippi State Maroons football team represented Mississippi State College during the 1955 college football season. The team was led by second-year head coach Darrell Royal and compiled a 6–4 record, sixth in the Southeastern Conference.

Halfback Art Davis was named to the FWAA/Look Magazine All America Team and voted their College "Player of the Year". Guard Scott Suber was named to the first team NEA All America Team.

After the season, Royal left in late February to become the head football coach at the University of Washington.

Schedule

References

Mississippi State
Mississippi State Bulldogs football seasons
Mississippi State Maroons football